Hose No. 2 is a former fire station in the Lower Falls area of Yarmouth, Maine, United States. Built around 1889, seven years before the town's first fire hydrants were installed, it stands in a wedge-shaped plot of land separating Main Street and Marina Road at what was formerly known as Staples Hill. By 1901, the town had "two hose companies of fifteen men each" and a hook and ladder company of ten men. A system of fire alarms, consisting of eight boxes, were in the process of being installed.

See also 

 Historical buildings and structures of Yarmouth, Maine

References 

Fire stations completed in 1889
Buildings and structures in Yarmouth, Maine
Defunct fire stations in Maine
1889 establishments in Maine